Delamarephorura capensis is a species of springtail within the family Tullbergiidae. The holotype of the species is a female, with the type locality being in South Africa, Kleinmond and Betty's Bay, in sandy soil.

References 

Poduromorpha
Animals described in 2013
Arthropods of South Africa